Bert King may refer to:
Bert King (Home and Away), a character on Home and Away
Bert King (rugby league), New Zealand rugby league international

See also
Albert King (disambiguation)
Robert King (disambiguation)
Bertie King, musician
Herbert King, actor